The family Notopteridae contains 10 species of osteoglossiform (bony-tongued) fishes, commonly known as featherbacks and knifefishes. These fishes live in freshwater or brackish environments in Africa and South and Southeast Asia.

With the denotation of "knifefish", the notopterids should not be confused with Gymnotiformes, the electric knifefishes from South and Central America. Although their manner of swimming is similar and they are superficially similar in appearance, the two groups are not closely related.

A few of the larger species, especially Chitala ornata, are food fish and occasionally aquarium pets. The name is from Greek noton meaning "back" and pteron meaning "fin".

Fossils 
The earliest fossils of this family are of Notopteridarum and Notopterus from the Late Cretaceous of India, about 70.6 to 66 million years ago. These fossils originate from the Rangapur microvertebrate site and Naskal microvertebrate site of Andhra Pradesh, which are part of the Intertrappean Beds.

Description
Featherbacks have slender, elongated, bodies, giving them a knife-like appearance. The caudal fin is small and fused with the anal fin, which runs most of the length of the body. Where present, the dorsal fin is small and narrow, giving rise to the common name of "featherback". The fish swims by holding its body rigid and rippling the anal fin to propel itself forward or backwards.

Notopterids have specialized swim bladders. The organ extends throughout the body and even into the fins in some cases. Although the swim bladder is not highly vascularised, it can absorb oxygen from air and also functions to produce sound by squeezing air through a narrow passage into the pharynx.

At least some species prepare nests and guard the eggs until they hatch.

Species
The 10 species in four genera are:
 Subfamily Xenomystinae Greenwood 1963
 Genus Papyrocranus Greenwood, 1963
 Papyrocranus afer (Günther, 1868) (reticulated knifefish)
 Papyrocranus congoensis (Nichols & La Monte, 1932)
 Genus Xenomystus Günther, 1868
 Xenomystus nigri (Günther, 1868) (African knifefish)
 Subfamily Notopterinae Bleeker 1851 (Asian knifefishes, featherbacks)
 Genus Chitala Fowler, 1934
 Chitala blanci (d'Aubenton, 1965) (royal knifefish or Indochina featherback)
 Chitala borneensis (Bleeker, 1851) (Indonesian featherback)
 Chitala chitala (F. Hamilton, 1822) (Indian featherback)
 Chitala hypselonotus (Bleeker, 1852)
 †Chitala lopis (Bleeker, 1851) 
 Chitala ornata (J. E. Gray, 1831) (clown featherback or clown knifefish)
 Genus Notopterus Lacépède, 1800
 Notopterus notopterus (Pallas, 1769) (bronze featherback)

References

Further reading
 Berra, Tim M. (2001). Freshwater Fish Distribution. San Diego: Academic Press. 
 The historical biogeography of the freshwater knifefishes.

 
Fish of Africa
Fish of Southeast Asia
Ray-finned fish families
Extant Maastrichtian first appearances